The Andhra Pradesh State Christian (Minorities) Finance Corporation is a state agency of the Government of Andhra Pradesh. It was set up in 2008 with objective to assist the Christian community in their socio-economic development. It is funded by the Government of Andhra Pradesh. The Andhra Pradesh Government has appointed Shri Maddirala Joseph Emmanuel (Mannie) as the chairman of the Andhra Pradesh State Christian Minorities Finance Corporation on 8 January 2019.

The schemes
Christian mass marriages
Pre Matric scholarships 
Post Matric scholarships 
Tuition fee reimbursement
Merit-cum-means scholarships 
Training, employment and placement
Free coaching for competitive examinations
Subsidy for bank-linked income generation schemes
Christian pilgrimage to Jerusalem 
Financial assistance for construction, renovation, and repairs to churches 
Financial assistance to Christian hospitals, schools, orphanages, old age homes, community halls-cum-youth and resource centers, and youth awareness programmes and promotion of Christian culture

References

State agencies of Andhra Pradesh
Christianity in Andhra Pradesh
Minorities-focussed government initiatives in India
Government welfare schemes in Andhra Pradesh